Keosauqua may refer to:

Places
Keosauqua, Iowa

Ships
USS Keosanqua, three United States Navy ships named for the Iowa town.